The Antiqua–Fraktur dispute was a typographical dispute in 19th- and early 20th-century Germany.

In most European countries, blackletter typefaces like the German Fraktur were displaced with the creation of the Antiqua typefaces in the 15th and 16th centuries. However, in Germany and Austria, both fonts coexisted until the first half of the 20th century.

During that time, both typefaces gained ideological connotations in Germany, which led to long and heated disputes on what was the "correct" typeface to use. The eventual outcome was that the Antiqua-type fonts won when the Nazi Party chose to phase out the more ornate-looking Fraktur.

Origin 

Historically, the dispute originates in the differing use of these two typefaces in most intellectual texts. Whereas Fraktur was preferred for works written in German, for Latin texts, Antiqua-type typefaces were normally used. This extended even to English–German dictionaries. For example, the English words would all be written in Antiqua, and the German words in Fraktur. Originally this was simply a convention.

19th century 
Conflict over the two typefaces first came to a head after the occupation of Germany and dissolution of the Holy Roman Empire by Napoleon in 1806, which led to a period in the history of Germany in which nationalists began to attempt to define what cultural values were common to all Germans. There was a massive effort to canonize the German national literature—for example, the Grimm Brothers' collection of fairy tales—and to create a unified German grammar.

In the context of these debates, the two typefaces became increasingly polarized: Antiqua typefaces were seen to be "un-German", and they were seen to represent this by virtue of their connotations as "shallow", "light", and "not serious". In contrast, Fraktur, with its much darker and denser script, was viewed as representing allegedly German virtues such as depth and sobriety.

During the Romantic Era, in which the Middle Ages were glorified, the Fraktur typefaces additionally gained the (historically incorrect) interpretation that they represented German Gothicism. For instance, Goethe's mother advised her son, who had taken to the clear Antiqua typefaces, to remain—"for God's sake"—German, even in his letters.

Otto von Bismarck was a keen supporter of German typefaces. He refused gifts of German books in Antiqua typefaces and returned them to sender with the statement  (I don't read German books in Latin letters!).

20th century 
The dispute between Antiqua and Fraktur continued well into the 20th century. Arguments for Fraktur were not only based on historical and cultural perceptions, but also on the claim that Fraktur was more suited for printing German and other Germanic languages, as their proponents claimed it to be more readable than Antiqua for this purpose.

A 1910 publication by Adolf Reinecke, claims the following advantages for using Fraktur as the German script:

 German script is a real reading script: it is more readable, i.e. the word images are clearer, than Latin script.
 German script is more compact in printing, which is an advantage for fast recognition of word images while reading.
 German script is more suitable for expressing German language, as it is more adapted to the characteristics of the German language than the Latin script.
 German script does not cause nearsightedness and is healthier for the eyes than Latin script.
 German script is still prone to development; Latin script is set in stone.
 German script can be read and understood all over the world, where it is actually often used as ornamental script.
 German script makes it easier for foreigners to understand the German language.
 Latin script will gradually lose its position as international script through the progress of the Anglo-Saxon world (here the author states that "Anglo-Saxons in the UK, the United States and Australia are still 'Germanic' enough to annihilate the Latin-scriptler's dream of a Latin 'world-script).
 The use of Latin script for German language will promote its infestation with foreign words.
 German script does not impede at all the proliferation of German language and German culture in other countries.

The  ("Association for Antiqua") had submitted a proposition to make Antiqua the official typeface (Fraktur had been the official typeface since the foundation of the German Empire) and no longer teach German  (blackletter cursive) in the schools. After a long and, in places, very emotional debate, the proposition was narrowly rejected 85–82.

Nazis had a complex and variable relationship with Fraktur. Adolf Hitler personally disliked the typeface. In fact, as early as 1934 he denounced its continued use in a speech to the :

Nonetheless, Fraktur typefaces were particularly heavily used during the early years of the Nazi era, when they were initially represented as true German script. In fact, the press was scolded for its frequent use of "Roman characters" under "Jewish influence", and German émigrés were urged to use only "German script".

One of the motivations seems to have been compatibility with other European languages. The edict mentions publications destined for foreign countries, Antiqua would be more legible to those living in the occupied areas; the impetus for a rapid change in policy probably came from Joseph Goebbels and his Propaganda Ministry. Readers outside German-speaking countries were largely unfamiliar with Fraktur typefaces. Foreign fonts and machinery could be used for the production of propaganda and other materials in local languages, but not so easily in German as long as the official preference for Fraktur remained.

Bormann's edict of 3 January 1941 at first forbade only the use of blackletter typefaces. A second memorandum banned the use of  handwriting, including , which had only been introduced in the 1920s. From the academic year 1941/42 onwards, only the so-called  ("normal script"), which had hitherto been taught alongside  under the name of "Latin script", was allowed to be used and taught.  did remain in use until 1945 for some applications such as cloth military insignia badges.

After the Second World War 
After the war, the Sütterlin script was once again taught in the schools of some states of Germany as an additional script, but it could not hold out against the usage of Latin cursive scripts. Nowadays, since few people who can read Kurrent remain, most old letters, diaries, etc. remain inaccessible for all but the most elderly German speakers, or specialists like genealogists or historians. As a consequence, most Germans find it difficult to decipher their own grandparents' letters, diaries, or certificates.

However, the Fraktur script remains present in everyday life in some pub signs, beer brands and other forms of advertisement, where it is used to convey a certain sense of rusticity and oldness (compare the English ye olde). However, many of these deviate from the traditional letterforms, specifically in the frequent untraditional use of the round s instead of the long s (ſ) at the beginning of a syllable, the omission of ligatures, and the use of letter-forms more similar to Antiqua for certain especially hard-to-read Fraktur letters such as k. Books wholly printed in Fraktur are nowadays read mostly for particular interests. Since many people have difficulty understanding blackletter, they may have trouble accessing older editions of classic works in German.

A few organizations such as the  continue to advocate the use of Fraktur typefaces, highlighting their cultural and historical heritage and their advantages when used for printing Germanic languages. But these organizations are small, somewhat sectarian, and not particularly well known in Germany.

In the United States, Mexico, and Central America, Old Order Amish, Old Order Mennonite, and Old Colony Mennonite schools still teach the Kurrent handwriting and Fraktur script.  German books printed by Amish and Mennonite printers use the Fraktur script.

References

Further reading 
 Silvia Hartmann: . Lang, Frankfurt am Main u.a. 1998, 
 Christina Killius: . Harrassowitz Verlag, Wiesbaden, 1999, 
 Albert Kapr: . Verlag Hermann Schmidt, Mainz 1993,

External links 
 Die Nationalsozialisten und die Fraktur (in German)
 Bund für deutsche Schrift und Sprache (in German)

Typography
Palaeography
German language
Martin Bormann
19th century in Germany
20th century in Germany